Coombe Hall (17 September 1871 – 1932) was a Scottish footballer who played in the Football League for Blackburn Rovers. He won the FA Cup with Blackburn in 1891, and the Scottish Cup with St Bernard's in 1895.

References

1871 births
1932 deaths
Scottish footballers
English Football League players
Blackburn Rovers F.C. players
St Bernard's F.C. players
Scottish Football League players
Date of death missing
People from Leith
Footballers from Edinburgh
Association football forwards
FA Cup Final players
Scottish emigrants to South Africa